Fredericksville is an unincorporated community in Rockland Township in Berks County, Pennsylvania, United States. Fredericksville is located at the intersection of Fredericksville and Five Points Roads.

History
A post office called Fredericksville was established in 1853, and remained in operation until 1911. The community was named for David Frederick, the owner of a local tavern.

References

Unincorporated communities in Berks County, Pennsylvania
Unincorporated communities in Pennsylvania